KSJJ (102.9 FM) is a commercial country music radio station in Redmond, Oregon, broadcasting to the Bend, Oregon, area.

Syndicated programming includes After Midnite with Blair Garner hosted by Blair Garner from Premiere Radio Networks.

References

External links
KSJJ official website

SJJ
Country radio stations in the United States
Redmond, Oregon
1981 establishments in Oregon
Radio stations established in 1981